Vincenzo Biava (18 April 1916 – March 2004) was an Italian sport shooter who competed in the 50 metre rifle, three positions event at the 1960 Summer Olympics.

References

1916 births
2004 deaths
Italian male sport shooters
ISSF rifle shooters
Olympic shooters of Italy
Shooters at the 1960 Summer Olympics